Kilby Snow (May 28, 1905March 29, 1980) was an American folk musician. A virtuoso Autoharpist, he was awarded the title of Autoharp Champion of North Carolina at the age of 5, but recorded only a single album for Folkways Records in the 1960s.

He was known for his "drag note" playing style, a technique that relied on his left-handedness to produce slurred notes that would be impossible for a right-handed player to recreate due to the reversed relationship between thumb and finger.

References

1905 births
1980 deaths
American folk musicians
20th-century American musicians
American autoharp players